The Metropolitan Transportation Authority (MTA) operates 80 express bus routes in New York City, United States. Generally, express routes operated by MTA Bus Company are assigned multi-borough (BM, BxM, QM, SIM) prefixes. Exceptions to this rule are 7 Brooklyn and Queens express routes operated by MTA New York City Transit. Those routes use an X prefix.

The unidirectional fare, payable with MetroCard or OMNY, a contactless payment system which will replace the Metrocard by 2023, is $6.75. Discount fare media is available. Except for the ad hoc X80 service, coins are not accepted on express buses; only a MetroCard (for now) or OMNY is accepted.

Express buses operate using over-the-road diesel-powered, 45-ft-long coaches, from Motor Coach Industries and Prevost Car. See also: MTA Regional Bus Operations Bus Fleet

Manhattan to Staten Island

Most routes travel to and from Staten Island via the Verrazzano-Narrows Bridge, Gowanus Expressway, and Hugh L. Carey Tunnel into Lower Manhattan. Some routes operate through New Jersey via the Goethals Bridge, New Jersey Turnpike, New Jersey Route 495, and Lincoln Tunnel to directly serve Midtown Manhattan.

On August 19, 2018, all of the Staten Island-Manhattan express bus routes were redesigned to offer simpler and direct routes, fewer stops to speed up the trips, and additional service for off-peak hours and weekends. The new routes originally planned consists of 21 express routes: 11 traveling to Midtown, 8 traveling to Downtown and 2 traveling to Greenwich Village via Battery Park City. The previously used "X" routes have been dropped in favor of "SIM," or Staten Island to Manhattan, routes. This was the result of the two-year Staten Island Bus Study conducted by MTA, launched in 2015, which analyzed trip performance data, ridership profiles and extensive customer input, to determine the most effective way to reconfigure the network.

All routes are operated by New York City Transit. All routes run during rush hours in the peak direction. In addition, the SIM1C, SIM3C, SIM4C and SIM33C provide off-peak weekday and weekend service, and the SIM1C provides overnight service. These four -C routes cover most stops in Manhattan served by other routes during peak hours.

History and notes

Manhattan to Brooklyn
X- routes are operated by New York City Transit, while BM-routes are operated by MTA Bus Company. All routes operate nonstop between Brooklyn and Manhattan via the Gowanus Expressway or Prospect Expressway to the Hugh L. Carey Tunnel, with some routes continuing non-stop via the FDR Drive to reach Midtown. The exception to this is the BM5, which also makes stops in Queens and uses Woodhaven Boulevard, the Long Island Expressway and Queens Midtown Tunnel to reach Midtown.

History and notes

Proposed new bus routes
The MTA released a draft plan for Brooklyn's bus network on December 1, 2022. The new plan retains the "BM" prefix and preserves all existing routes. The BM1, BM2, BM3, BM4, X27/X37, and X28/X38 will each be split into three routes: a rush-hour downtown route, a rush-hour midtown route, and an off-peak downtown and midtown route. In general, the revised plan includes the following changes:
 All routes with the X prefix will be relabeled with the BM prefix; i.e. the X27, X28, X37, and X38 will become the BM7, BM8, BM37, and BM38 respectively.
 All peak downtown routes will have a single-digit number (e.g. BM1).
 All peak midtown routes will have a double-digit number beginning in 3 (e.g. BM31).
 All off-peak downtown and midtown routes will have a single-digit number and the suffix "C" (e.g. BM1C).

Manhattan to Queens
X- routes are operated by New York City Transit, while QM- routes are operated by MTA Bus Company. All Midtown routes except for the  Super Expresses operate nonstop outbound via the Ed Koch Queensboro Bridge, while Downtown routes operate via the FDR Drive and the Queens Midtown Tunnel. All inbound service operates via the Long Island Expressway and Queens Midtown Tunnel.

History and notes

Proposed new bus routes

In December 2019, the MTA released a draft redesign of the Queens bus network with 77 routes. The routes were given a "QMT" label to avoid confusion with existing routes. The "QMT" prefix was tentative; in the final plan, all bus routes would have been labeled with "QM", similar to the existing routes. The final redesign was initially expected in mid- or late 2020, but the first draft attracted overwhelmingly negative feedback, with 11,000 comments about the plans. The redesign was delayed due to the COVID-19 pandemic in New York City. Planning resumed in mid-2021.

The original draft plan was dropped, and a revised plan with 85 routes was released on March 29, 2022. The new plan retains the "QM" prefix and preserves most of the existing routes. Most of the bus routes have relatively minor changes:
 All Queens-bound express buses use the Long Island Expressway; currently, some Queens-bound buses from Midtown use Queens Boulevard or Northern Boulevard.
 The X63, X64, and X68 will be renamed the QM63, QM64, and QM68 respectively.
 One new express route is planned: the QM65 from Lower Manhattan to Laurelton.
 The QM3 will be eliminated.
 The QM10 and QM40 will become the QM11, QM12, and QM42.

Original draft plan

Manhattan to the Bronx
All routes are operated by MTA Bus.

History and notes 
Former Liberty Lines Express routes were taken over by MTA Bus Company on January 3, 2005, while former New York Bus Service routes were taken over on July 1, 2005.

Manhattan intra-borough

Former routes

New York City Transit

Staten Island Express routes
Most X routes were discontinued between 2010 and 2018 due to budget cuts and a reimagining of the bus network.

In 2015, the MTA began a comprehensive study of express bus lines on Staten Island. These lines had not been drastically changed since the 1980s, and as a result, they had been updated piece-by-piece. As a result, these routes were circuitous, redundant, and infrequent. The MTA proposed replacing all of the existing express bus routes with simpler and shorter variants, a proposal supported by 76% of Staten Island residents who had learned about the study. In March 2018, after hosting several meetings with Staten Island residents, the MTA announced that express bus service to Staten Island was expected to be completely reorganized in August 2018. As part of the redesign, all of the existing bus routes would be discontinued and replaced with new routes with a "SIM" prefix on August 19, 2018. The "SIM" prefix was chosen to reduce confusion with the "X"-prefixed routes they replaced, but deviate from the "S" prefix used by local Staten Island bus routes. The routes that were discontinued prior to August 18, 2018 were: X6, X13, X16, X18, X20, X21 (first use), and X30 (first use).

The remaining X routes are expected to be revamped and renamed sometime between 2019 and 2021.

Other X- routes

MTA Bus Company

Command Bus Company (special service)
Eight special routes, which were operated by Pioneer Bus then Command Bus Company. All service discontinued in 2001.

Note: An additional route, the BM2S bus route, ran from Starrett City to Downtown Manhattan ran via Flatlands Avenue between East 80th Street and East 105th Street. The service still operates as part of regular BM2 service during rush hour. In addition, Command operated ferry shuttle buses around the Bay Ridge area from the Brooklyn Army Terminal after September 11, 2001, for the free ferry ride to/from the Wall Street pier. Both Pioneer Bus then Command Bus operated bus service to/from Roosevelt Raceway.

Avenue B and East Broadway Transit Company (special service)
The Avenue B and East Broadway Transit Company the M7 express route between 5th Avenue & 110th Street and World Trade Center. It additionally operated four special routes to racetracks in the New York City metropolitan area. Service was discontinued on April 1, 1980. The M7 express route became a part of the X23 route upon being taken over by the New York City Transit Authority, then became the original X90. X90 service to 5th Avenue & 110th Street was discontinued in 1996.

Caravan Bus Systems (temporary operation)
From late 1988 to early 1990, Queens Surface Corporation discontinued the QM1 Wall Street and QM3 after the City of New York pulled its funding for the service. Caravan Bus Systems Inc. picked up these routes due to equipment shortages and budget cuts with the approval of the NYCDOT. Caravan Bus Systems Inc. ran the QM1 Wall Street and QM3 with no subsidy from NYC and returned the lines to Queens Surface Corp. in 1990 after protest from Queens elected officials who were afraid that Caravan Bus Systems Inc. would discontinue the routes after Caravan Bus Systems Inc. lost money on the routes and was refused the city subsidy that these routes got under Queens/Steinway Transit Corp. prior to Queens Surface taking over the routes on July 1, 1988.

Metro Apple Express (MAX)
Metro Apple Express (MAX) operated buses in Brooklyn, Manhattan, Queens and to Jones Beach during its existence. The BM10 started on Sunday, June 10, 1984. They did not have fare boxes on the bus so the drivers were able to make change. Their bus schedules were color-coded for each route, BM10 was black, BM11 was blue, BM12 was green and BM15 was red. The president was Patrick Condren.

Red & Tan in Hudson County

Atlantic Express
All routes going into Manhattan terminate at Midtown on East 59th Street and Madison Avenue.

All routes traveled via into West Shore Expressway, Goethals Bridge into New Jersey's New Jersey Turnpike, Lincoln Tunnel; in Manhattan: 34th Street, Madison Avenue (northbound) and 5th Avenue (Southbound).

These routes were operated by Academy Bus until June 2001, when the franchises were awarded to Atlantic Express. All of these routes have been rebranded or eliminated.

References

External links
MTA NYC Transit - Bus Service

Bus routes express
New York City express
Express
Lists of New York City bus routes
Air pollution in New York City